Kamkata-vari is the largest Nuristani language. It contains the main dialects Kata-vari, Kamviri and Mumviri. Kata-vari and Kamviri are sometimes erroneously reckoned as two separate languages, but according to linguist Richard Strand they form one language.

The Kamkata-vari language is spoken by 40,000–60,000 people, from the Kata, Kom, Mumo, Kshto and some smaller Black-Robed tribes in parts of Afghanistan and Pakistan. There are dialectal differences of the Kamkata-vari speakers of Pakistan. The most used alternative names for the language are Kati or Bashgali.

Classification 
It belongs to the Indo-European language family and is in the Nuristani group of the Indo-Iranian branch.

Dialects 
There are four main dialects: Eastern Kata-vari, Western Kata-vari, Kamviri and Mumviri. The last two are sometimes erroneously defined as separate languages. Eastern Kata-vari and Kamviri are commonly both referred to as Shekhani in Chitral.

Status 
Literacy rates are low: below 1% for people who have it as a first language and between 15% and 25% for people who have it as a second language. The Katavari dialect can be heard on radio in Afghanistan.

References

External links 
 
 
 
 
 
 

Nuristani languages of Afghanistan
Languages of Khyber Pakhtunkhwa
Nuristani languages